Gianluca Gianenni Maradona Maria is a Curaçaoan international footballer who currently plays for KFC Esperanza Pelt as a winger.

Career
Maria started his career with PSV Eindhoven. In the 2012–13 season he played on loan for FC Eindhoven in the Dutch Eerste Divisie. He signed with MVV Maastricht in July 2013. On 6 January 2015, it was announced that Maria had signed with RKC Waalwijk, after his contract with MVV Maastricht had been dissolved on 1 January 2015.

References

External links
 Voetbal International profile 

1992 births
Living people
Dutch footballers
Curaçao footballers
Curaçao international footballers
FC Eindhoven players
MVV Maastricht players
RKC Waalwijk players
Hapoel Ashkelon F.C. players
JVC Cuijk players
SV TEC players
Eerste Divisie players
Liga Leumit players
People from Venray
2014 Caribbean Cup players
Expatriate footballers in Israel
Expatriate footballers in Belgium
Curaçao expatriate sportspeople in Israel
Curaçao expatriate sportspeople in Belgium
Association football wingers
Dutch expatriate sportspeople in Belgium
Dutch expatriate sportspeople in Israel
Dutch expatriate footballers